Limón Black Star is a Costa Rican association football team based in Limón. It is set to make its debut in the Segunda División de Costa Rica, starting in the 2022–23 season.

The team originated in the aftermath of Limón's demise in 2021 due to financial irregularities. Local businessmen purchased the franchise of Marineros de Puntarenas to relocate the team to Limón.

Its name is an homage to the Liberty Hall, commonly known as the Black Star Line Building. This hall, which was destroyed by fire in April 2016, was an important landmark of downtown Limón, and a symbol of Afro–Costa Ricans, particularly those within the Limón Province.

The team uses the Pan-African colours in homage to the Rastafari movement, ditching the traditional green color used by previous teams in the city such as Limonense and Limón.

History
During the first half of 2021, Limón entered "a series of bad decisions" that ultimately led to the team's relegation to the Liga de Ascenso. Despite efforts to nullify the 2020–21 Liga FPD season and avoid relegation, the club's situation worsened. The club had accumulated numerous delayed payments to the Costa Rican Social Security Fund, which prevented them from playing matches in the Liga de Ascenso. By January 2022, Limón had accumulated over ₡98 million in debts to the Security Fund. The club could not solve the situation and was officially relegated to the Tercera Division de Costa Rica, losing its category as a professional team.

Immediately after the team's disappearance, former administrative manager Celso Gamboa announced his intentions of acquiring the franchise of Marineros de Puntarenas, a team based in Puntarenas that struggled in coexisting with the more traditional Puntarenas F.C. On 28 April 2022, the acquisition of Marineros was officially confirmed, and the team was renamed to Limón Black Star. The name is an allusion of the Liberty Hall, also known as the Black Star Line, a prominent landmark in downtown Limón and a symbol of Afro-Costa Rican culture, which was destroyed by a fire in April 2016.

On 25 May 2022, the new team's administration announced the badge and colours, adopting the Pan-African colouring due to the Rastafari movement and the city's historical ties with the Afro-Caribbean people.

Stadium

The Juan Gobán Stadium is a soccer stadium located in Limón, head of the province of the same name, on the Caribbean coast of Costa Rica.

In February 2010, a synthetic turf measuring 91 meters long by 72 meters wide was installed.  The following reforms included the construction of boxes, press areas, complete remodeling of the dressing rooms and installation of artificial lighting.

In September 2010, the Juan Gobán stadium was reopened after a series of renovations that involved a year and a half of work, in addition to an investment of close to $1 million, 800 thousand dollars.

Among the novelties is the expansion of the dressing room area from two to four, a weight room, a doping room, laundry, four sodas, two offices, the installation of 20 restrooms and a VIP area for 220 people.  In addition to the total replacement of the roof of the shadow grandstand.

In general, the capacity of the redoubt was expanded to 2,349 people.  The stadium was home to the Limon F.C.  of the First Division of Costa Rica from 2010 to 2020.

Current squad
As of January 25, 2023

Staff
The staff members were announced on 28 April 2022. Aside from the members listed below, Carlos Watson and Juan Cayasso have also been mentioned as collaborators.

See also
Limón F.C.
A.D. Limonense

References

Football clubs in Costa Rica
Association football clubs established in 2022
2022 establishments in Costa Rica